Derek Balfour Erskine Hoskin is the former Anglican Bishop of Calgary. He was consecrated on 29 September 2006, having previously been the incumbent at Red Deer, Alberta.

References

21st-century Anglican Church of Canada bishops
Anglican bishops of Calgary
Living people
Year of birth missing (living people)